Brook Martin (born 27 March 1981) is an Australian former professional rugby league footballer who played in the 2000s. He played in the National Rugby League (NRL) for the Melbourne Storm in 2000.

Playing career
Martin did not play any junior club rugby league, instead playing for his school Christian Outreach College, where he excelled in athletics, especially hurdles. He was 110m hurdles Queensland schoolboys champion in 1997. In 1998, he finished third and decided to focus on rugby league, joining Easts Tigers, eventually making his senior debut in 2000.

Martin was playing for Easts Tigers in 2000, but was drafted in by Melbourne to cover injuries and representative selections. He would go on to score 22 tries in 22 appearances for Easts in the Queensland Cup, transferring to Melbourne at the end of the 2000 season on a two year contract.

Selected for the Junior Kangaroos at the end of the 2000 season, Martin's NRL career stalled as he didn't add to his single NRL appearance for Melbourne.

References

External links
RLP Profile
Storm profile (archived)

1981 births
Living people
Australian rugby league players
Melbourne Storm players
21st-century Australian people
Rugby league wingers
Norths Devils players
Junior Kangaroos players
Eastern Suburbs Tigers players